Eugenia Attendolo Bolognini (1837–1914), styled by marriage as duchessa Litta Visconti Arese, was an Italian noblewoman, philanthropist and hostess of a famous literary salon in Milan.

She was for a time a lady-in-waiting to the Queen of Italy, Margherita of Savoy. She is most known for her love affair with King Umberto I of Italy, which lasted from the time of his marriage in 1868 until his death in 1900.

References
 Fonte: Andrea Spiriti e Laura Facchin - Luoghi da Vivere - Monza e Brianza - Arte Natura Cultura di una provincia lombarda da scoprire - Provincia di Milano - Progetto Monza e Brianza

Italian ladies-in-waiting
1837 births
1914 deaths
Mistresses of Italian royalty
Italian salon-holders
19th-century Italian women
20th-century Italian women
Italian duchesses